Desnuesiella is a Gram-positive and facultatively anaerobic bacterial genus from the family of Clostridiaceae with on known species (Desnuesiella massiliensis). Desnuesiella massiliensis has been isolated from the Gut flora from a child which suffered from kwashiorkor.

References

Clostridiaceae
Bacteria genera
Monotypic bacteria genera
Taxa described in 2016